Daniel Sturgeon (October 27, 1789July 3, 1878) was an American physician, banker and Democratic party politician from Uniontown, Pennsylvania. He served in both houses of the state legislature and represented Pennsylvania in the United States Senate.

Biography
Daniel Sturgeon was born on October 27, 1789, in Mount Pleasant Township, present-day Adams County, Pennsylvania. He later moved with his parents to Pittsburgh, Pennsylvania in 1804. He attended Jefferson College in Canonsburg, Pennsylvania, and Jefferson Medical College in Philadelphia. Sturgeon practiced medicine in Uniontown, Pennsylvania, until being appointed county coroner in 1813. He served in the Pennsylvania House of Representatives from 1818 until 1824 and the Pennsylvania State Senate for the 19th district from 1825 until 1830, serving as President of that body for the final two years of his term until serving as Pennsylvania Auditor General from 1830 until 1836. Immediately prior to being elected to the U.S. Senate, Sturgeon served as Pennsylvania Treasurer from 1838 until 1839. The Senate seat on which Sturgeon served is now held by Democratic Senator Bob Casey Jr.

Sturgeon was elected by the state legislature to the United States Senate on January 14, 1840, to serve the term that commenced on March 4, 1839. He was re-elected to the U.S. Senate in 1845 and was not a candidate for re-election in 1851. His term expired in March 1851. While a U.S. Senator, Sturgeon served as chairman of the Committee on Patents and the Patent Office and the Committee on Agriculture.

Following his tenure in the U.S. Senate, Sturgeon was appointed treasurer of the United States Mint in Philadelphia by President Franklin Pierce, serving from 1853 until 1858. He died in Uniontown, Pennsylvania, on July 3, 1878 and was interred in Oak Grove Cemetery.

References

External links

 

1789 births
1878 deaths
People from Adams County, Pennsylvania
American people of Scotch-Irish descent
Pennsylvania Democratic-Republicans
Pennsylvania Jacksonians
Democratic Party United States senators from Pennsylvania
State treasurers of Pennsylvania
Pennsylvania Auditors General
Democratic Party members of the Pennsylvania House of Representatives
Democratic Party Pennsylvania state senators
People from Uniontown, Pennsylvania
Physicians from Pennsylvania
American coroners
19th-century American physicians
Washington & Jefferson College alumni
Jefferson Medical College alumni